The 2010 World Team Judo Championships were held in Antalya, Turkey from 30 to 31 October 2010.

Medal summary

References

External links
 

 
WC 2010
World Team Judo Championships